The Lutheran Church–Missouri Synod (LCMS) is organized into 35 districts, 33 of which are defined along geographic lines. Each district has a president who oversees the congregations in his district, which are further subdivided into local circuits. The position of president is roughly analogous to the role of bishop in many church bodies, but LCMS doctrine supports a generally congregationalist polity as opposed to an exclusively hierarchical governance.

Each district chooses its own president from among the pastors in the district at its triennial convention. In some districts the district president occupies a full-time position, while in others he continues to serve as pastor in a congregation.

The 35 district presidents plus the synod president form the Council of Presidents (COP), one of whose duties is to place graduates from the two LCMS seminaries as pastors in congregations that have requested such a candidate. If a congregation desires an experienced pastor to fill a vacancy, the district president may suggest a list of possible candidates (gleaned from interactions with the COP as well as other sources), but the district president does not assign pastors in this case; the congregation extends a "call" directly to the pastor.

History
From the time of its founding in 1847 until 1854, the LCMS held annual synod-wide conventions. However, given the growth in number of congregations and the large geographic area covered by the synod (Iowa to western New York and Minnesota to Louisiana), a new constitution was adopted in the latter year splitting the synod into four geographical districts (Eastern, Western, Northern, and Central) that would take over some of the responsibilities of the general synod. The original districts were further divided over the years to create the current 33 geographical districts.

List of districts
The following is a chronological list of former and current districts of the LCMS. Former district names are in italics.

References

External links
Districts of the LCMS